Joaquim Queiróz (born 6 April 1971) is a Portuguese sprint canoeist who competed in the early to mid-1990s. At the 1992 Summer Olympics in Barcelona, he was eliminated in the semifinals of both the K-2 500 m and the K-2 1000 m events. Four years later in Atlanta, Queiróz was eliminated in the semifinals of both the K-2 500 m and the K-2 1000 m events.

References
Sports-Reference.com profile

1971 births
Canoeists at the 1992 Summer Olympics
Canoeists at the 1996 Summer Olympics
Living people
Olympic canoeists of Portugal
Portuguese male canoeists